Oktubre is the second studio album by Argentine rock band Patricio Rey y sus Redonditos de Ricota, released in 1986. It is the band's last album to feature to Piojo Ávalos, Tito D'Aviero and Willy Crook as band members, who left the band after the tour between late 1986 and early 1987. In 2007, the Argentine edition of Rolling Stone ranked it fourth on its list of "The 100 Greatest Albums of National Rock".

Background 
The album cover and its concept are inspired by the 1917 Russian Revolution while the sound incorporates elements of post-punk influence in the 1980s New wave imposed by groups such as The Cure, Joy Division and The Police. The band garnered some airplay with "Jijiji" and "Ya nadie va a escuchar tu remera" and, as a result, Patricio Rey pursued a more melodic, radio friendly direction on their future albums.

Oktubre was officially released on 4 October 1986 and its presentation took place on 18 and 25 October at Paladium in front of 1200 fans. Keyboardist Andrés Teocharidis participated in both shows. Some CD bootlegs from these shows were released with Teocharidis, being his only contribution to the band due to his death in a car accident in early 1987.

Hailed by both critics and fans as the band's masterwork, the album contains some of the Patricio Rey's signature songs, such as "Jijiji", "Ya nadie va a escuchar tu remera", "Fuegos de octubre" and "Motor Psico".

Cover 
The cover art was designed by Ricardo Rocambole Cohen.

To the right side, Che Guevara's face can be distinguished.

Track listing 
All songs written by Solari/Beilinson.

Personnel 
Patricio Rey
Indio Solari - Vocals.
Skay Beilinson - Lead guitar.
Tito "Fargo" D'Aviero - Rhythm guitar.
Semilla Bucciarelli - Bass guitar.
Piojo Avalos - Drums.
Willy Crook - Saxophone.

Guests
Daniel Melero - Keyboards.
Claudio Cornelio - Percussion.

Additional personnel 
Osvel Costa - Engineer.
Ricardo "Rocambole" Cohen - Cover & Art.
Poli - Executive producer.

References 

1986 albums
Patricio Rey y sus Redonditos de Ricota albums
Works about the Russian Revolution